Anna Santos (born July 9, 1987), better known by her stage name Anna, is a singer of the group Bon-Bon Blanco. She has five brothers and is the youngest sibling in the family. She uses Anna in her solo efforts, but she uses her real name when part of the band. She was born in Tokyo, Japan, but she has American citizenship.

Her husband is Japanese baseball player Manabu Mima.

External links 
 Bon-Bon Blanco official site
 Official blog

Japanese women singers
1987 births
Singers from Tokyo
Living people
21st-century Japanese singers
21st-century American women singers
21st-century American singers
21st-century Japanese women singers